Giuseppe Borrello (1820–1894) was an Italian poet, who wrote mainly in Sicilian, and wasa an Italian patriot.

Borrello was born and died in Catania.  In 1837, at a time when Catania was experiencing a cholera epidemic, he was granted special emergency powers by the Bourbon government, but was relieved of his duties once his liberal views and attitudes became known.

He participated in the popular revolts of 1848, being one of the main provocateurs in Catania.   During the Risorgimento of 1860 he became aligned with Garibaldi's forces and reached the rank of Major.

An anthology of his poems is simply entitled:  Puisii Siciliani (Sicilian Poems).

Example 
The following short poem pays homage to the renowned Chestnut Tree of One Hundred Horses:

References 

1820 births
1894 deaths
Sicilian-language poets
Writers from Catania